Grandmaster is a 2012 Indian Malayalam-language neo-noir action thriller film written and directed by B. Unnikrishnan and produced by Ronnie Screwvala and Siddharth Roy Kapur under the production company UTV Motion Pictures. The film stars Mohanlal as IG Chandrasekhar, a senior IPS officer who begins investigating a series of murders after receiving an anonymous note. The supporting characters are played by Priyamani, Narain, Anoop Menon, Babu Antony, Jagathy Sreekumar, and Arjun Nandhakumar.

Grandmaster was the debut Malayalam production of UTV Motion Pictures. The film was released on 3 May 2012 to widely positive reviews from critics and was a success at the box office. Grandmaster was released in the online video streaming service Netflix in the United States and Canada, making it the first ever Malayalam film to be released on Netflix. It was also the first Malayalam film to be released with English subtitles outside Kerala. The movie is based on the book The A.B.C Murders by Agatha Christie which was already adapted by Unnikrishnan for the script of a TV series named Black and White.

Plot
IG (Inspector General) Chandrasekhar, a senior IPS officer, is the head of the newly created Metro Crime Stopper Cell in Kochi. Chandrasekhar arrests Jerome, a psychologically deviant man, and rescues three girls he had kidnapped, but his ex-wife Deepthi, who is a lawyer, manages to get Jerome sent to treatment in a psychiatric facility, rather than a prison sentence. It turns out that the three girls had been insulting and harassing Jerome, which had led to his actions of kidnapping them in the first place.

Chandrasekhar gets a congratulatory note from an anonymous man calling himself "Z," who challenges Chandrasekhar to figure out how he is going to bump off one target after the other. Chandrasekhar is forced to investigate a string of murders: coffee shop owner Alice, famous singer Beena Thomson and leading businesswoman Chandrika Narayanan. These murders follow a mysterious alphabetical pattern, and each victim also has a cross slit on their forehead. Around the same time, Chandrasekhar's daughter is preparing for a play under the lead of famous actor Mark Roshan.

Chandrasekhar divorced ten years earlier because he discovered that Deepthi, his wife was using information from him for professional gain. Deepthi confesses to Chandrasekhar that the three recently murdered women were all involved in the murder of a man named Paul Mathew and made it look like a suicide. Chandrasekhar realizes that Deepthi is the next target and comes with her to their daughter's play, where they meet a religious fanatic named Victor Rosetti who had been present in all three crime scenes, disguised as a salesman, and has been stalking Deepthi. The recurring theme of chess is obvious in the game between Chandrasekhar and the unknown Mr. Z.

Chandrashekhar understands that there is a mastermind behind Victor Rosetti and decides to play a 'queen's gambit' in his own words. Chandrasekhar finally manages to corner Victor on the rooftop of a theater, and Victor commits suicide by falling off the rooftop to the pavement. Then, Chandrasekhar questions Dr. Jacob and says that he has evidence that he is the killer of the three women, in a ploy to mislead the real killer. He has his men protect his daughter but lets his wife into the school where the play was held. The real murderer comes in, attempting to strangle Deepthi with a red scarf. Fortunately, Chandrasekhar stops him and then finally corners the real murderer on the stage. The murderer turns out to be none other than Mark himself, who is then revealed by Chandrasekhar to be Paul Mathew's younger brother, his real name being Roshan Mathew.

Mark confesses that he has held a grudge against the women for his brother's death, which Chandrasekhar had already known. Then, Mark also confessed that, disguised as a priest, he manipulated Victor, a schizophrenic patient, into believing that he had committed the murders himself. He had planned for Victor to commit the final murder on Deepthi during the play, but attempted to use the scenery of the fight between Chandrasekhar and Victor to complete his plan. In a last-minute attempt to avenge his brother, Mark tries to jump from the stage to murder Deepthi with a dagger, but is shot to death by Chandrasekhar, thus saving Deepthi's life. The film then ends with Chandrasekhar and Deepthi, along with their daughter, finally together again in their house.

Cast

 Mohanlal as I.G Chandrasekhar IPS
 Priyamani as Adv. Deepthi, ex-wife of Chandrasekhar
 Anoop Menon as Dr. Jacob Varghese, A psychiatrist
 Narain as SP Kishore IPS
 Jagathy Sreekumar as Circle Inspector Rashid 
 Babu Antony as Victor Rosetti
 Arjun Nandhakumar as Mark Roshan / Roshan Mathew
 Roma Asrani as Beena Thomson
 Siddique as Paul Mathew
 Devan as ADGP Vijayan IPS
 Seetha as Chandrika
 Santosh Sleeba as Sub-Inspector Sandeep Menon
 Sreelekshmy V as Dakshayini Chandrasekhar
 Riyaz Khan as Jerome Jacob
 Mithra Kurian as Bindya Mathew
 Fathima Babu as Alice 
 Rajashree as Susan , City Police Commissioner, an egoistic cop
 Manikuttan as Aby Kuriakose
 Ambika Mohan as Radhika, Chandrasekhar's mother
 Gayathri as Alice, Jerome's mother

Production
Grandmaster is the maiden production of Bollywood production company UTV Motion Pictures in Malayalam cinema. About naming the film Grandmaster, Unnikrishnan said he cannot thinks a better title than Grandmaster, "the whole story is about a grandmaster. He is a great chess enthusiast; he is also a great detective. It is the most appropriate title". For the leading female role of advocate Deepthi, Unnikrishnan approached Andrea Jeremiah, Sonia Agarwal, and Reemma Sen before signing Priyamani. Grandmaster is the first film of Priyamani with Mohanlal. Few years back Priyamani had expressed her desire to act in a film alongside Mohanlal. Deepthi is a criminal lawyer who is separated from her husband Chandrasekhar and in the turn of events, they are forced to work together.

Principal photography began in December 2011 and was carried out primarily at Kochi and Ottapalam.

Soundtrack

The soundtrack of the film was composed by Deepak Dev and consisted six tracks. It was released on 4 April 2012, launched at a function held at People's Plaza, Kochi.

Release
Grandmaster was expected to be released on 27 April 2012, but was postponed. The film was released on 3 May 2012. In Vue, it was released on 29 July 2012. Grandmaster was released in the online video streaming service Netflix in the United States and Canada, making it the first ever Malayalam film to be released on Netflix. It was also the first Malayalam film to be released with English subtitles outside Kerala.

Reception

Critical reaction
Rediff.com rated the film 3.5 out of 5. Sify's critic rated the movie as "watchable" (3.5/5) and said, "Grandmaster easily turns out to be an engaging watch".

Accolades

In popular culture
Grand Master's Kitchen, a multi-cuisine restaurant opened by director B. Unnikrishnan in 2016 in Palayam, Thiruvananthapuram, was named after the film.

References

External links
 
 

2010s Malayalam-language films
2012 action thriller films
2012 films
Indian action thriller films
UTV Motion Pictures films
Films shot in Kochi
Films shot in Ottapalam
Films directed by B. Unnikrishnan
Films based on Hercule Poirot books